Lars Benny Westblom (born April 30, 1954, in Gävle, Sweden) is a retired Swedish professional ice hockey goaltender.

Westblom began his career playing for Brynäs IF in 1972. In 1977, Westblom joined Västra Frölunda and remained with the team until 1983.  He then spent one season with HV71 before re-joining Västra Frölunda in 1984 and stayed with them until his retirement in 1990.

References

External links

1954 births
Brynäs IF players
Frölunda HC players
HV71 players
Living people
Swedish ice hockey goaltenders
People from Gävle
Sportspeople from Gävleborg County